Paul Julian Banks (born 3 May 1978) is an English-American musician, singer, songwriter, and DJ. Noted for his baritone singing voice, he is best known as the lead vocalist, rhythm guitarist, and bassist of the American rock band Interpol. He released a solo album called Julian Plenti is... Skyscraper in 2009 under the name Julian Plenti, though his solo material is now recorded under his real name.

Early life
Paul Julian Banks was born in Clacton-on-Sea on 3 May 1978. He has an older brother. His father's corporate role for an automobile manufacturer required that the family relocate frequently. When Banks was three years old, the family left England for the U.S. and settled in Bloomfield Hills, Michigan. They moved to Spain when he was 12 years old, and it was here that he studied at the American School of Madrid in Pozuelo de Alarcón before the family moved back to the U.S. and lived in New Jersey. His father was later transferred to Mexico, where Banks finished high school at the American School Foundation in Mexico City. Describing his childhood, he said they "moved around like a military family" even though they were not.

Banks was involved in stage productions during his time at the American School Foundation, playing the lead role in the musical South Pacific. He later attended New York University, where he studied English and comparative literature, and worked at magazines such as Gotham and Interview after graduating. He later took a data entry job at the Scholastic Corporation and worked in a café in order to devote more of his time to music.

Career

Interpol
In the summer of 1997, Banks reconnected with fellow NYU undergrad Daniel Kessler, whom he had met previously on a study abroad program in Paris. Kessler then asked Banks to join Interpol, a band he had started with bassist Carlos Dengler and drummer Greg Drudy. Banks was initially not inclined to join a band as he had been writing songs as a solo artist, but eventually joined Interpol as a guitarist and vocalist after listening to the type of music they were making. Beginning with Interpol's fifth album, El Pintor, Banks has also served as the band's bassist. In the music video for the album's lead single "All the Rage Back Home", he can be seen playing a Fender Precision Bass.

Other projects
Banks has solo projects under various monikers. In August 2009, he released the solo album Julian Plenti is... Skyscraper under the name Julian Plenti, followed by the five-song EP Julian Plenti Lives... in June 2012. In October 2012, Banks released his second full-length studio album, Banks.

In 2013, Banks released the hip hop mixtape Everybody on My Dick Like They Supposed to Be, which included contributions by rappers such as Talib Kweli and El-P.

In June 2016, Banks and rapper RZA formed the duo Banks and Steelz and announced their collaborative album Anything But Words, which featured guest appearances by rappers Kool Keith, Ghostface Killah, Method Man, and Masta Killa, and singer Florence Welch. Two singles, "Love + War" and "Giant", were released.

In March 2020, Banks announced that he had teamed up with Matt Barrick (of The Walkmen and Fleet Foxes) and Josh Kaufman to form a new band called Muzz; he then released their first single, "Bad Feeling".

Musical style
Banks was inspired to become a musician by Nirvana, but has said that he does not try to emulate his greatest influences because he thinks he cannot live up to them: "I would never try to sing like Frank Black or Kurt Cobain because you just can't do it." His baritone voice, singing technique, and lyrics are most often compared to that of Joy Division frontman Ian Curtis.

During Interpol's early years, Banks typically played a black Les Paul Custom guitar. He then started using a Fender Jaguar (primarily due to the use of the tremolo in songs such as "Pioneer to the Falls") and a Gibson Flying V (which, for a time, had the word "breasts" spelled out in white tape on it) for songs from Our Love to Admire, and used his Les Paul for songs from Antics and Turn on the Bright Lights, although some songs like "Obstacle 1" were played with the Jaguar because of the impracticality of switching. Songs like "Mammoth" were recorded using his Les Paul for this same reason.

Banks used his Jaguar as his primary guitar for the end leg of the Our Love to Admire tour, and was also seen using a Gibson ES-135 for songs such as "Not Even Jail", but since the 2010 tour leg he has not been since using the Jaguar or ES-135 and has only been seen using his traditional black Les Paul in live settings. His Flying V, with the white tape now removed, can be seen in the music video for "Barricade". His ES-135 was his primary guitar during his live performances as alter ego Julian Plenti. In the 2010s, during live performances of his solo work, he began playing a Dave Murray signature Fender Stratocaster with two humbucker pickups and a middle position single coil, possibly to avoid having to change guitars between songs for the diverse sounds on his solo records. In terms of bass guitars, he has been seen using a black Fender Precision Bass with a maple fretboard.

According to one source, Banks has used effects pedals such as the BOSS TU-2, Z.Vex Super Duper 2 in 1, EHX Micro POG, MXR Micro Amp, MXR Bass Octave Deluxe, Way Huge Swollen Pickle, Ibanez TS9DX, BOSS DN-2, and 2 MXR Carbon Copy Analog Delay (one set at higher repeats). His pedalboard on the Julian Plenti tour consisted of a BOSS TU-2, Way Huge Aqua-Puss, BOSS DN-2, EHX POG 2, Blackstar HT Dual Tube Distortion, and an MXR Carbon Copy. Since 2004, he has used two Fender Pro Reverb amplifiers.

Personal life
Though he was born in England to English parents, Banks speaks with a Midwestern American accent due to growing up primarily in Michigan. As a result of his time in Spain and Mexico, he is fluent in Spanish and speaks the language with a Mexican accent. In contrast to Interpol's often melancholic indie rock sound, Banks has been a fan of hip hop since he was a child and has worked as a hip hop DJ under the pseudonym DJ Fancypants.

Banks began a relationship with Danish supermodel Helena Christensen in 2011. They split up in 2015. He later began dating Juliet Seger, with whom he lives in Berlin. He also maintains an apartment in Lower Manhattan. In November 2022, he and Seger were engaged and expecting their first child together.

Discography

Solo releases

Studio albums

EPs

Singles

Interpol 
 Turn on the Bright Lights (2002)
 Antics (2004)
 Our Love to Admire (2007)
 Interpol (2010)
 El Pintor (2014)
 Marauder (2018)
 The Other Side of Make-Believe (2022)

Banks & Steelz 
 Anything But Words (2016)

Muzz 
 Muzz (2020)

References

External links

 Interpol
 Julian Plenti
 Julian Plenti on Vimeo

1978 births
Living people
English emigrants to the United States
English baritones
English rock guitarists
English male guitarists
English rock singers
English male singer-songwriters
American baritones
American male singer-songwriters
American rock guitarists
American rock singers
American post-punk musicians
New York University alumni
People from Clacton-on-Sea
Interpol (band) members
American male guitarists
21st-century English singers
21st-century American guitarists
21st-century American male singers
21st-century American singers
American singer-songwriters